Garzê  or Ganzi (Kandze), is a town and county seat in Garzê County, Garzê Tibetan Autonomous Prefecture in western Sichuan Province, China.  Despite Garzê Prefecture being named after the town, the prefecture capital is Kangding, 365 km to the southeast. As of 2010, Garzê was home to 16,920 inhabitants. Garzê is an ethnic Tibetan township and is located in the historical Tibetan region of Kham. It contains the 15th century Kandze Monastery, home to over 500 Gelugpa monks.

Geography

Garzê lies in the large Garzê valley at 3390 metres above sea level and is surrounded by rocky terrain and mountains. The Yalong River's tributary Rongcha River passes through the town from north to south.

Gallery

References

Citations

Sources 

 Dorje, Gyurme (1999). Footprint Tibet Handbook with Bhutan. 2nd Edition. Footprint Handbooks, Bath, England. .
 Forbes, Andrew ; Henley, David (2011). China's Ancient Tea Horse Road. Chiang Mai: Cognoscenti Books. ASIN: B005DQV7Q2
 Leffman, David, et al. (2005). The Rough Guide to China. 4th Edition. Rough Guides, New York, London, Delhi. .
 Mayhew, Bradley and Michael Kohn. (2005). Tibet. 6th Edition. Lonely Planet. .

External links
Hudong Encyclopedia 

Populated places in the Garzê Tibetan Autonomous Prefecture
Towns in Sichuan

es:Ganzi